Lepturdrys novemlineata is a species of beetle in the family Cerambycidae, the only species in the genus Lepturdrys.

References

Acanthocinini